Mary Snell-Hornby (born 2 April 1940), is a British-Austrian translator and scholar.

Career
Mary Snell was awarded a State Scholarship to study at Saint Felix School, Southwold, Suffolk, where she attained G.C.E. Advanced and Scholarship Level in English, French and German (with Distinction) in 1958. She studied English, French, German, and Moral Philosophy at the University of St Andrews, where she obtained her MA with First Class Honours in German Language and Literature in 1962. 

The Austrian Ministry of Education granted her a post-graduate research scholarship for research on Austrian drama. which she followed at the University of Vienna, Austria. In 1966 she became Bachelor of Philosophy at the University of St Andrews for her thesis The dramatic satire of Karl Kraus and Johann Nestroy. A comparative study.

In 1981, she went to the University of Zurich, Switzerland, where she got a habilitation with venia legendi for "Englische Linguistik und Sprachdidaktik" for her thesis Verb-descriptivity in German and English. A contrastive study in semantic fields. In 1987 the University of Zurich granted her a Ph.D. for her thesis Translation Studies - An Integrated Approach.

In 1993 Mary Snell-Hornby was appointed President of the then newly formed European Society for Translation Studies (EST).

Family
She is daughter of Rev. Arthur Snell (d. 1969) and Florence Mary Snell, née Adams (d. 2004). She was married 6 April 1973 to Anthony Hornby, lecturer in English at the Language Centre, University of Augsburg, Germany. They have a daughter, Astrid, born 26 March 1976 in Munich. Since 1989, Snell-Hornby has held dual British and Austrian nationality.

Works
 Translation Studies: An Integrated Approach (1988, 1995).
 Handbuch Translation (in collaboration with other authors, 1999/2006). Tübingen: Stauffenburg-Verlag.
 The Turns of Translation Studies: New paradigms or shifting viewpoints? (2006). Amsterdam/Philadelphia: John Benjamins.

References

People from Mirfield
People educated at Saint Felix School
Alumni of the University of St Andrews
University of Zurich alumni
British expatriate academics
Austrian translators
British translators
Austrian women writers
British women writers
British translation scholars
Living people
1940 births
British emigrants to Austria